Griffin Yueh Feng (1909 or July 29, 1910 – March 3, 1999) was a Chinese film director and screenwriter who worked in the Cinema of Hong Kong. He worked at the Shaw Brothers Studio's for many years and directed nearly 90 films.

Early life 
Yueh was born as Da Zichun in Shanghai, China.

Education 
Yueh studied at the Asia Photography School.

Career 
Yueh appeared in a film as an extra in 1929. By 1933, Yueh became a director following some experience as an assistant. In 1949, Yueh became a director for Great Wall Company in Hong Kong. Yueh's first Hong Kong film as a director was An Unfaithful Woman (aka A Forgotten Woman), a 1949 Mandarin Drama. Yueh was also a director for Cathay Studio, International Films, and Motion Picture & General Investment Co. Ltd. In 1959, Yueh became a director for Shaw Brothers Studio.
Yueh's first Hong Kong film for Shaw Brothers Studio was The Other Woman (aka Husband's Lover), a 1959 Mandarin   Romantic Comedy. In 1959, Yueh was became a screenwriter for Hong Kong films. Yueh's last film was The Two Cavaliers (aka Furious Slaughter), a 1973 Mandarin Martial Arts film.

Personal life 
On July 3, 1999, Yueh died in Hong Kong. He was 90.

Awards
He received numerous nominations throughout his career. He won the Golden Horse Best Screenplay awards for the Bitter Sweet (1963). In the 1990s his films gained much more respect, and he was accoladed for his lifetime contribution to Hong Kong and Chinese cinema.
 1999 Lifetime Achievement Award.by Film Directors'Guild.

Filmography

Films 
This is a partial list of films. 
 1933 The Raging Tide 
 1938  My Son Is A Woman 
 1940 3 Smiles - Part One 
 1940  3 Smiles - Part Two 
 1947  Three Women 
 1949 An Unfaithful Woman (aka A Forgotten Woman) 
 1949 Blood Will Tell (aka Blood-Stained Begonia) 100 Must See Hong Kong Movies: Blood Will Tell
 1950 Home Sweet Home 1950 The Flower Street 
 1952 The Stormy Night 
 1952 Nonya 
 1952 Modern Red Chamber Dream 
 1953 Rainbow Rhythms 
 1954 Pavilion In The Spring Dawn 
 1956 Merry-Go-Round 
 1956 Green Hills And Jade Valleys 
 1957 The Battle Of Love 
 1957 Golden Lotus 
 1958 A Tales Of Two Wives 1958 Scarlet Doll 
 1959 The Wayward Husband 
 1959 Spring Frolic 
 1959 Our Beloved Son 
 1959 The Other Woman 
 1959 For Better, For Worse 
 1960 When The Peach Blossoms Bloom 
 1960 Street Boys 
 1960 The Deformed 
 1961 The Swallow 
 1961 The Husband's Secret 1962 Madam White Snake 
 1963 Revenge Of A Swordsman 
 1963 Bitter Sweet 
 1964 The Last Woman Of Shang 1964 Lady General Hua Mu-lan 
 1964 Between Tears and Smiles - co-director
 1965 The West Chamber 1965 The Lotus Lamp 
 1967 Rape of the Sword 1967 The Dragon Creek 
 1967 Auntie Lan - Director, screenwriter. 
 1968 Spring Blossoms 
 1968 The Magnificent Swordsman 
 1968 The Bells Of Death 
 1969 The Three Smiles 
 1970 The Younger Generation 
 1970 A Taste of Cold Steel 
 1970 The Golden Knight 
 1971 Sons and Daughters 
 1971 The Silent Love 
 1972 Young Avenger 
 1972 Trilogy Of Swordsmanship 
 1972 Martial Hero 
 1973 The Two Cavaliers 
 1973 A Gathering Of Heroes 1974 Village Of Tigers''

References

External links

 Griffin Yueh Feng hkcinemagic.com
 
 Hong Kong Film Programmes Office: "The Writer / Director in Focus II: Griffin Yue Feng"

20th-century births
1999 deaths
Film directors from Shanghai
Hong Kong film directors
Writers from Shanghai
Shaw Brothers Studio films
Chinese emigrants to Hong Kong